Broken Bells is the debut album from Broken Bells, consisting of James Mercer of indie rock band The Shins with producer and multi-instrumentalist Brian Burton (aka Danger Mouse), and was released on March 9, 2010.

In 2011 Broken Bells was nominated for Best Alternative Music Album at the 53rd Grammy Awards.

Background
After forming in 2009, Broken Bells released their eponymous debut studio album, Broken Bells, in March 2010. Released to positive critical reception, Broken Bells was a success critically and commercially, peaking at #7 on the Billboard Billboard album chart, and appearing in the top 20 in Australia, Canada and Denmark. The album also appeared at #126 on the Billboard Hot 100 End-year chart for 2010. Two singles were released during the album's cycle. "The High Road", released in 2009 and featuring the Broken Bells track of the same name, peaked at #10 on the Billboard Alternative Songs chart, which is the highest peak by the band on the chart so far, and was certified Gold in Canada by Music Canada. "The Ghost Inside", also featuring the eponymous Broken Bells track and "Meyrin Fields", was released in 2010. The band also released an extended play during the album's cycle in 2011, entitled Meyrin Fields.

Composition
Alongside space pop, Broken Bells leans into "sparkling [and] dense" folk rock. Baroque pop flourishes feature highly, from "Mongrel Heart"s mariachi trumpet to the Beach Boys-recalling vocals of "Your Head Is On Fire".

Release
In addition to the standard edition of the album, a deluxe version was released, designed as a music box. When opened, it played a track titled "The Overture," which wasn't included on the album. The box also contained stickers, posters, lobby cards and a leather book.

Promotion
The first single from the album, The High Road, was offered as a free download from the band's website on December 21, 2009, before being officially released on December 22, 2009.

The music video for "The Ghost Inside" featured actress Christina Hendricks and was inspired by 1970s science fiction and the "Golden Age of Hollywood".

Track listing
All songs written by James Mercer and Brian Burton.

 Instrumental version appeared as a B-side of "The High Road" single.
 Vocal version found through iTunes LP version.
 Extra track "Meyrin Fields" appeared as a B-side of "The Ghost Inside" single.

Charts

Weekly charts

Year-end charts

Personnel

Broken Bells
 Brian Burton – organ, synthesizer, bass, piano, drums, programming, production
 James Mercer – bass, guitars, vocals
 Additional personnel
 Margot Aldcroft – strings
 Jeff Antebi – artists and repertoire, artist development
 Peggy Baldwin – strings
 Alisha Bauer – strings
 Ruth Bruegger – strings
 Ronald Clark – strings
 Yvette Devereaux – strings
 Jacob Escobedo – artwork, design, layout
 Kirstin Fife – strings
 Stefanie Fife – strings
 Vanessa Freebairn-Smith – strings
 Ilona Geller – strings
 Neel Hammond – strings
 Kennie Takahashi – programming, engineer, mixing

 Peter Kent – strings
 Johana Krejci – strings
 Daniele Luppi – string conductor
 Stephen Marcussen – mastering engineer
 Miriam Mayer – strings
 Calabria McChesney – strings
 Todd Monfalcone – engineer, mixing assistant
 Michele Nardone – strings
 Frank W. Ockenfels – photography
 Carolyn Osborn – strings
 Anton Riehl – score preparation
 Christopher J. Tedesco – strings
 Philip Vaiman – strings
 Jessica van Velzen – strings
 Jennifer Walton – strings
 John Wittenberg – strings
 Alwyn Wright – strings
 Adriana Zoppo – strings

References

External links
 
 Artwork

2010 debut albums
Albums produced by Danger Mouse (musician)
Broken Bells albums
Columbia Records albums
Space age pop albums